Majdy  is a village in the administrative district of Gmina Stawiguda, within Olsztyn County, Warmian-Masurian Voivodeship, in northern Poland. It is located in Warmia.

The village has a population of 128.

In 1864, the village had a population of 111, including 110 Catholic Poles and one Jew.

Transport
The S51 highway runs nearby, east of the village.

References

Populated lakeshore places in Poland
Villages in Olsztyn County